The Commercial Historic District in Potlatch, Idaho was listed on the National Register of Historic Places in 1986.  In 1986, it included seven contributing buildings and a contributing object.  It includes work by architect C. Ferris White and work by A.M. Homes.

It includes seven buildings of the administrative center of historic Potlatch, which was a company town of the Potlatch Lumber Company, plus some additional objects. Specifically, it includes:
Washington. Idaho and Montana Railway Depot (1906), a two-story west-facing building, the first major building completed in Potlatch, designed by C. Ferris White

Gymnasium building (1916), a two-story frame building designed by architect A. M. Holmes, the largest building in Potlatch.  Southfacing, with a gambrel roof, it has an open porch on its east, south, and west sides supported by 16 Doric columns.
Implement Store, a two-story frame building with a gambrel roof.  Served as storage warehouse for the lumber company's Townsite Department, the maintenance department for the town.
Administrative Office (1917), a two-and-one-half-story frame building which was the main administrative office building for the lumber company, and in the 1950s became city hall.
Storage Building, a two-and-one-half-story building with a metal roof on a concrete foundation
Creamery (probably 1906), a one-story building with a hipped metal roof, sided with clapboard, west-facing, adjacent to the depot building to its south.
a large boulder monument to William Deary
Engine 1 of the Washington, Idaho and Montana Railway.

The city of Potlatch offers a free walking tour guide, "A Walking Tour of the Potlatch Commercial District" at the city hall, at 195 6th Street.  The guide is provided by the Potlatch Historical Society.

See also
 National Register of Historic Places listings in Latah County, Idaho

References

Buildings and structures in Latah County, Idaho
Historic districts on the National Register of Historic Places in Idaho
National Register of Historic Places in Latah County, Idaho
History of rail transportation in the United States